Turneraceae Kunth ex DC. is a family of flowering plants consisting of 120 species in 10 genera.  The Cronquist system placed the Turneracids in the order Violales, but it is not currently recognized as a family by the Angiosperm Phylogeny Group in the APG III system of 2009, which includes the taxa in the Turneraceae in Passifloraceae as a subfamily (Turneroideae).

Description
Most species in Turneraceae are tropical or sub-tropical shrubs, with a few trees.  Half of the family's species belong to the genus Turnera, including the herb damiana (T. diffusa, T. aphrodisiaca), the yellow alder (T. pumilea), which is not really an alder, and the "ramgoat dashalong" (T. ulmifolia).  Another type of plant in Turneraceae with a vernacular name is stripeseed, which is actually three different species of the genus Piriqueta - the pitted stripeseed (P. cistoides), the rigid stripeseed (P. racemosa), and the purple stripeseed (P. viscosa).

Genera
The genera typically included in this family are:
Adenoa
Erblichia
Hyalocalyx
Loewia
Mathurina
Piriqueta
Stapfiella
Streptopetalum
Tricliceras (Wormskioldia)
Turnera

References

External links 
 Entry on Turneraceae from L. Watson and M. J. Dallwitz (1992 onwards). The Families of Flowering Plants.

Malpighiales families
Historically recognized angiosperm families